Scott Meadow is a private equity professional and faculty member of the University of Chicago Booth School of Business, where he is a clinical professor of entrepreneurship. He is the recipient of the Richard J. Daley Award. The Daley Medal acknowledges a single individual who has given direct and extraordinary support to the state of Illinois by participating in or being an advocate for the venture capital and private equity industry.

For nearly thirty years, Meadow has been a principal investor in the venture capital and private equity industry.  He started his career at William Blair and Company, where he became a partner in 1983.  He has been a General Partner at William Blair Venture Partners, Frontenac Company, the Sprout Group and is an associate partner at Edgewater Growth Capital Partners and founder of Maroon Partners, a consultancy enterprise focused on advising entrepreneurial and private equity endeavors and providing expert witness support in commercial disputes.

Throughout his career, he has approved hundreds of equity financings, and originated or created more than sixty investments including two dozen healthcare service companies.

Since 2000 Meadow has held the position of clinical professor of entrepreneurship at the University of Chicago Booth School of Business. He was awarded the 2002, 2003, 2004, and 2005 Phoenix Prize and the Faculty Excellence Award in 2010. He was designated by Business Weeks "Guide to the Best Business Schools" (2003, 8th edition) and (2005, 9th edition) as one of the outstanding entrepreneurial professors in the country.

Meadow has taught more than 10,000 students at Chicago Booth, in Entrepreneurial Finance and Private Equity, Commercializing Innovation (which he created), Introduction to Venture Capital and the New Venture Challenge courses. He is a member of the advisory board for the Innovation Fund at the University of Chicago. He has taught internationally, including London, Paris, Brussels, Warsaw, Mumbai, Delhi, Bangalore, Singapore, São Paulo, Rio de Janeiro, Porto Alegre, Dubai, Abu Dhabi, Buenos Aires, Mexico City, Beijing, Shanghai and Hong Kong.

Meadow was recognized in 1998 by Venture One as one of five outstanding healthcare service investors in the venture capital industry.

Representative investments include Coventry Corporation, Healthsouth, Sunrise Assisted Living, Sunrise International, Managed Health Network, Aspen Education Services, Pathology Partners, Heritage Healthcare, MedPartners, the Sports Authority, CompUSA and Staples. Professor Meadow served on the board of directors of National Equipment Services during its emergence from Chapter 11. He serves on the Board of Advanced Life Sciences, Barrier Safe, Dais,Seurat Therapeutics and GenerationOne.

He is an advisor to the private equity management firm Alpha Associates and, since 2010, acted as a testifying expert to the economic consulting firms Analysis Group, Coherent Economics, Compass Lexecon, Cornerstone Associates and Charles River Associates.

Meadow earned his A.B. magna cum laude from Harvard College in British history and literature, where he distinguished himself as a bodybuilding athlete, winning the Mr. New England, Mr. Collegiate U.S.A., and Mr. Northern States competitions. 
He completed his M.B.A. from Harvard Business School with concentrations in strategy and finance.

References 

VentureOne'98 Summit Program Directory:  Best of Breed in Venture Capital.  List of Conference Advisory Board Nominees

China interview on Entrepreneurship and Private Equity

http://money.163.com/special/scottmeadow/

Discussion on Chicago Booth Global Initiative Program:

https://web.archive.org/web/20101213123322/http://chibus.com/2010/9/21/the-chicago-booth-global-initiatives-team-a-conversation

Chicago Booth Faculty Information Page

http://www.chicagobooth.edu/faculty/bio.aspx?person_id=12825366528

Edgewater Funds Official Biography

https://web.archive.org/web/20110710170644/http://www.edgewaterfunds.com/team/member/scott_meadow

Harvard University article on athletic history

http://www.thecrimson.com/article/1976/2/27/scott-meadow-esthetic-bodybuilder-pthe-motivation/

Compass Lexecon Advisory Relationship

Compass Lexecon's 2010 Client Newsletter

Special:WhatLinksHere/Scott Meadow

University of Chicago faculty
Hotchkiss School alumni
Harvard College alumni
Harvard Business School alumni
Living people
Year of birth missing (living people)